Nathaniel Mark Dushku (born June 8, 1977) is an American director, producer and actor. He is the youngest of the three elder brothers of actress Eliza Dushku.

Early life
Dushku was born in Boston, Massachusetts, the third son of Philip R. Dushku, an administrator and teacher in the Boston Public Schools, and Judith "Judy" Dushku (née Rasmussen), a political science professor at Suffolk University in Boston. Dushku's father was Boston-born, of Albanian heritage, with his parents coming from the city of Korçë, and his mother, from Idaho, is of Danish, English, Irish and German descent. His parents were divorced in 1980.

Dushku's mother is a member of the Church of Jesus Christ of Latter-day Saints (LDS Church), and the children – Nathaniel, two older brothers, Aaron and Benjamin, and one younger sister, Eliza, who started professional acting at age 10 – were raised as Mormons, although Nate, Aaron and their sister, at least, later parted from the LDS Church.

Dushku is openly gay and married to restaurateur turned scriptwriter and film producer Amnon (Ami) Meyer Lourie, from New York.

Career

Acting
Dushku began his acting career with the teen / student drama Undressed and the J. J. Abrams college drama Felicity.

Production and direction
Dushku and his sister produced a film, Dear Albania, about a visit to their father's ancestral home in Albania.  

Nate and Eliza Dushku also worked on the feature film Mapplethorpe for over 12 years, eventually producing it with writer/director Ondi Timoner. Starring Matt Smith, it premiered and won an Audience Award at the Tribeca Film Festival in 2018.

Filmography

References

External links

 

1977 births
Male actors from Boston
American male film actors
American male television actors
American gay actors
American people of Albanian descent
American people of Danish descent
American people of English descent
American people of German descent
American people of Irish descent
Living people
20th-century American male actors
21st-century American male actors
LGBT people from Massachusetts
LGBT Latter Day Saints
Former Latter Day Saints